L'isola dei famosi (Italian for The Celebrity Island or The Island of the Famous), is an Italian reality show, first aired on Rai 2 in 2003, before moving to Canale 5 in 2015. This program is the Italian Survivor for celebrities.

The program 
The first eight seasons (2003-2011) of the show were hosted on Rai 2 by Simona Ventura: after her departure in June 2011 to Sky Italia the program underwent a big change in the format; starting in the ninth season in 2012, the program had two new hosts, Nicola Savino in the studio of Rai 2 and former winner Vladimir Luxuria from the island; in 2015 both were replaced: Alessia Marcuzzi is the host in the studio, while Alberto "Alvin" Bonato is the host from the island. Alvin was replaced in 2017 by Stefano Bettarini, Ventura's former husband. Bettarini was replaced in 2018 by Stefano De Martino, former husband of Belén Rodríguez, therefore in 2019 De Martino was replaced by Alvin. Following the spread of COVID-19 in the winter of 2020, Mediaset decided to cancel this program due to social distancing rules; in 2021 Marcuzzi, as host in the studio, and Alvin, as host from the island, were replaced by Ilary Blasi and Massimiliano Rosolino. Blasi in 2022 kept her position as host in the studio while Rosolino was replaced by Alvin, who came back, for the fourth time, as host from the island.

Format 
L'Isola dei Famosi is the Italian version of the international format of Survivor, created by Charlie Parsons. In February 2001, a show with a very similar format, called Survivor, was aired on Italia 1 and hosted by two journalist of TG5, Benedetta Corbi (as host in the studio) and Pietro Suber (as host from the island), but this program failed in TV ratings and was cancelled after one season. The first three seasons of L'isola took place in the Dominican Republic on the Samaná Peninsula. The show moved from the 4th to 6th season to Cayos Cochinos, Honduras. Due to the 2009 Honduran coup, however, the 7th season of the show was held in the Corn Islands, Nicaragua only to return to Honduras from the 8th season.

In L'Isola dei Famosi, a group of celebrity competitors (and non-celebrity competitors as well, in certain seasons) must survive on a desert island with no facilities. Competitors must build shelter, procure food and water, and find ways to maintain warmth. Candidates have a basic survival kit which, through group efforts, can be enhanced with new objects. Once a week there is a challenge winner, determined through contests of skill, balance, strength, or other factors. The competitor(s) who wins the week's challenge becomes immune from the elimination: a live nomination takes place every week, in which competitors are gradually eliminated. The last remaining contenders compete for the final prize during the season finale. Usually a portion of the final prize is donated to charity. Note that each contestant is paid by the production based on how many weeks he/she participates in the reality show.

Seasons

Season 1
 Date: 19 September 2003 – 28 November 2003 (57 days).
 Location: Samaná, Dominican Republic.
 Hosted: Simona Ventura (in the studio) and Marco Mazzocchi (from the island).

Contestants

Nomination table

Season 2
 Date: 24 September 2004 – 13 November 2004 (57 days).
 Location: Samaná, Dominican Republic.
 Hosted: Simona Ventura (in the studio) and Massimo Caputi (from the island).

Contestants

Nomination table

Note 1: Sergio and Valerio both agreed to remain in Isolation, but only one of the two could continue. A public vote was opened and Sergio won.
Note 2: Paolo retired from the game on Day 8 due to physical problems. Carmen came in his place.
Note 3: On Day 43, two of the three contestants involved in the public vote were eliminated.
Note 4: On Day 50, immediately after Aida's elimination, a new public vote was opened among the three contestants not in Isolation.

Season 3
 Date: 13 September 2006 – 1 November 2006 (57 days).
 Location: Samaná, Dominican Republic.
 Hosted: Simona Ventura (in the studio) and Massimo Caputi (from the island).

Contestants

Nomination table

Note 1: During the first two weeks of the game, the castaways were divided into two teams, the Beach team (women), and the Cavern team (men).
Note 2: In Week 2, Enzo Paolo switched from the Cave team to the Beach team.
Note 3: In Week 2, Elena switched from the Beach team to the Cave team.
Note 4: On Day 8, Enzo Paolo walked from the game due to health problems. He was replaced by Idris.
Note 5: In Week 5, Albano and Sandy walked, the former for family problems, the latter for health reasons. Antonio and Maurizio replaced them.

Season 4
 Date: 13 September 2006 – 1 November 2006 (57 days).
 Location: Cayos Cochinos, Honduras.
 Hosted: Simona Ventura (in the studio) and Paolo Brosio (from the island).

Contestants

Nomination table

Note 1: On Day 13, Domiziana walked; she was replaced by Den.
Note 2: On Day 15, Kris & Kris walked; they were replaced by Marina.
Note 3: On Day 30, Den walked; he was replaced by Linda.
Note 4: On Day 36, Massimo was ejected. He was replaced by Leone.
Note 5: On day 50, each contestant had to nominate two others: the 3 with the most votes faced a public vote, where one person would be eliminated right away, while the other two faced another public vote for the whole week.

Season 5
 Date: 19 September 2007 – 28 November 2007 (71 days).
 Location: Cayos Cochinos, Honduras.
 Hosted: Simona Ventura (in the studio) and Francesco Facchinetti (from the island).

Contestants
 Celebrity contestant
 Non-Celebrity contestant

Nomination table

Season 6
 Date: 15 September 2008 – 24 November 2008 (71 days).
 Location: Cayo Cochinos, Honduras.
 Hosted: Simona Ventura (in the studio) and Filippo Magnini (from the island).

Contestants
 Celebrity contestant
 Non-Celebrity contestant

Nomination table

Season 7
 Date: 24 February 2010 – 5 May 2010 (71 days).
 Location: Corn Island, Nicaragua.
 Hosted: Simona Ventura (in the studio) and Rossano Rubicondi (from the island).

Contestants
 Celebrity contestant
 Non-Celebrity contestant
 Celebrity's relative contestant

Nomination table

Season 8
 Date: 14 February 2011 – 26 April 2011 (72 days).
 Location: Cayo Cochinos, Honduras.
 Hosted: Simona Ventura (in the studio) and Daniele Battaglia (from the island).

Contestants
 Celebrity contestant
 Non-Celebrity contestant
 Celebrity's relative contestant

Nomination table
 Super Leader: he/she eliminates another contestant without any public vote.
 Leader: he/she is exempt from nominations and immediately nominates a contestant.
 The contestant is immune.
 The contestant was nominated but, by winning a challenge, replaces himself/herself with another contestant to face the public vote.

Season 9
 Date: 25 January 2012 – 5 April 2012 (72 days).
 Location: Cayo Cochinos, Honduras.
 Hosted: Nicola Savino (in the studio) and Vladimir Luxuria (from the island).

Contestants
 Heroes Team
 Elected Team

Nomination table

Season 10
 Date: 2 February 2015 – 23 March 2015 (50 days)
 Location: Cayo Cochinos, Honduras
 Hosted: Alessia Marcuzzi (in the studio) and Alvin (from the island)

Contestants

Nomination table

Notes
 Note 1: Brice and Cecilia were exempt as they were new housemates and were on another island. While they were in Playa Desnuda, they were exempt from nominations, but they had to face eviction as the weekly evicted contestant.
 Note 2: Alex, Fanny and Pierluigi won immunity in a challenge and they were able to name a nominee.
 Note 3: As the winner of the immunity challenge, Andrea was given the power to name a second nominee. Patrizio decided to stay in Playa Desnuda.
 Note 4: Two new contestants arrived at the island, Cristina and Margot. A public vote was opened and Cristina received the most votes to enter the show with 65.51%. Cristina was exempt as she was a new contestant.
 Note 5: As the winner of the immunity challenge, Rocco was given the power to name a second nominee. Charlotte decided not to stay in Playa Desnuda.
 Note 6: As the winner of the immunity challenge, Donatella was given the power to name a second nominee. Melissa decided not to stay in Cayo Paloma.
 Note 7: As the winner of the immunity challenge, Alex was given the power to name a second nominee. Pierluigi decided not to stay in Cayo Paloma.
 Note 8: Cecilia moved to Playa Uva to live with the rest of the contestants and she was immune. Brice remained in Cayo Paloma, so he was still exempt from nominations.
 Note 9: Brice moved to Playa Uva to live with the rest of the contestants and he was immune. Rocco decided to stay in Cayo Paloma.
 Note 10: There was a double elimination through a task that did not include Alex Belli because he was the leader. Cristina Buccino won the task and saved Valerio Scanu; it saved Cecilia Rodríguez who saved Donatella, so that Andrea Montovoli and Rachida Karrati decided to save Andrea Montovoli; then Rachida Karrati was eliminated.
 Note 11: Rocco was in Cayo Paloma; he would be exempt from nominations but he would have to face eviction as the weekly evicted contestant. Rachida decided not to stay in Cayo Paloma.
 Note 12: As the winner of the immunity challenge, Brice was given the power to name a second nominee. Alex decided to stay in Cayo Paloma.
 Note 13: There were two more eliminations. A test was carried out to decide the second elimination. They formed two teams: one composed of men: Valerio, Brice and Andrea, and a women's team composed of Donatella, Cristina and Cecilia. The test was won by the women's team who had to save a member of the men's team that lost. They decided to save Valerio, then Andrea and Brice went to televoting to decide the second elimination. The vote showed that Andrea was eliminated with 69.38% of the vote. He refused to undress on Cayo Paloma; therefore he was finally eliminated.
 Note 14: Another test was performed to decide the third out. Among Donatella, Cristina and Cecilia the race was won by Donatella. Among Valerio and Brice, the race was won by Brice Martinet. The winners of the two heats and Donatella Brice competed in a final third heat: the test was won by Brice. The latter had to send two competitors to remote voting. He decided to send Valerio and Cristina. Cristina was the third person eliminated with 69.40% of the vote. She refused to undress on Cayo Paloma; therefore she was finally eliminated.
 Note 15: A public vote opened in Cayo Paloma to decide who between Rocco and Alex may remain in the game. Rocco was saved with 68.78% of the vote.
 Note 16: Brice won the immunity challenge but was not given the power to name a second nominee. Donatella and Rocco were tied with 1 vote and Brice had to break it nominating Rocco.
 Note 17: Immunity testing was conducted. Brice Martinet won, who then had the right to make another finalist immune. He decided to save Donatella, then Cecilia Rodríguez and Valerio Scanu went to televoting to decide fourth place. Valerio Scanu was permanently removed and ranked fourth, with 61.04% of the vote.
 Note 18: Another test was performed. Donatella won, making her the first finalist. Televoting between Brice Martinet and Cecilia Rodríguez decided third place. The 63.20% vote said that Cecilia Rodríguez was third place, so Brice Martinet was the second finalist.

Season 11
 Date: 9 March 2016 – 9 May 2016 (62 days)
 Location: Cayo Cochinos, Honduras
 Hosted: Alessia Marcuzzi (in the studio) and Alvin (from the island)

Contestants

Nomination table

Season 12
 Date: 30 January 2017 – 12 April 2017 (73 days)
 Location: Cayo Cochinos, Honduras
 Hosted: Alessia Marcuzzi (in the studio) and Stefano Bettarini (from the island)

Contestants

Nomination table

Season 13
 Date: 22 January 2018 – 16 April 2018 (85 days)
 Location: Cayo Cochinos, Honduras
 Hosted: Alessia Marcuzzi (in the studio) and Stefano De Martino (from the island)

Contestants

Nomination table

Notes
 Note 1: Simone entered the game as a 'Ghost Contestant' and had to live on the Island without being caught by the other contestants. After failing to do so, he received a punishment and was automatically nominated in Week 3.

Season 14
 Date: 24 January 2019 – 1 April 2019 (68 days)
 Location: Cayo Cochinos, Honduras
 Hosted: Alessia Marcuzzi (in the studio) and Alvin (from the island)

Contestants

Nomination table

Notes

Season 15
 Date: 15 March 2021 – 7 June 2021 (85 days)
 Location: Cayo Cochinos, Honduras
 Hosted: Ilary Blasi (in the studio) and Massimiliano Rosolino (from the island)

Contestants

Carolina Stramare (model and winner of Miss Italia 2019) was announced as one of the original 16 cast members, but decided to drop out of the competition before it started due to family health issues.

Nomination table

Notes
 Note 1: On Day 1, the contestants were divided in two teams: the 'Buriños' (Hicks) and the 'Rafinados' (Refined). The two teams faced off in a challenge where the winning team would win Immunity. The losing team would vote first, and the most voted contestant would end up facing public vote. Later, the winning team would vote among the other members of the losing team (not including the one already nominated), adding another person to the public vote.
 Note 2: On Day 4, the losing team would vote first in secret, later the winning team would vote in public. Both the losing and winning team had to nominate someone from the losing team, not including the contestants that joined the competition on Day 4. The sum of the votes of the two teams would determine the contestants up for elimination. Additionally, due to an injury, Roberto was momentarily absent as he was receiving medical care, therefore he was exempt from nominations.
 Note 3: On Day 8, there was a challenge that determined a team switch. The two teams had to indicate the strongest contestant from the opposing team: the two would become the 'reward' of the challenge, joining the winning team. Before receiving the strongest contestant from the other team, however, the winning team would have to point out their weakest link through a saving chain, starting from their own strongest contestant. The person remaining and not saved with the chain would go to the losing team, as a sort of exchange to make teams even numbered. Gilles (Buriños) and Brando (Rafinados) were indicated as the strongest contestants, so Brando joined the winning team, while Daniela was indicated as the weakest link and joined the losing team. The newly reformed teams later competed for another immunity challenge.
 Note 4: On Day 11, Andrea entered the competition and there was a challenge to determine which team he would be on: Valentina and Francesca won the challenge for the 'Buriños'. Later, Andrea and Roberto faced off in the immunity challenge. Roberto won immunity for his team, and had to start a saving chain to determine the first nominated contestant from the losing team, excluding Andrea who had just arrived. The chain went: Roberto → Beppe → Valentina → Francesca → Gilles → Awed. Vera was left out and was automatically nominated. Additionally, due to an injury, Paul was momentarily absent as he was receiving medical care, therefore he was exempt from nominations.
 Note 5: On Day 18, Brando, Fariba, Vera and Ubaldo were all living on Parasite Island. Fariba and Ubaldo, as they had started the game there as potential contestants, were ultimately deemed ready to officially enter the game, while Brando and Vera, who had started the game as official contestants but had been eliminated in a public vote, had to face off in a nomination where only one of them would be voted back into the game. The loser would go to another Island, Playa Esperanza.
 Note 6: On Day 32, out of the 3 nominated contestants, only one would be saved by the public vote, while the other 2 would have their fate decided by the Leader of the episode. Andrea had to decide who to save between Fariba and Roberto, making the other the first nominated contestant of the week. He saved Roberto.
 Note 7: On Day 43, the contestants were divided in 2 teams. Two leaders were elected, one for each team, and the members could only vote for someone of their own team. The two teams were: 1) Awed, Emanuela, Fariba, Isolde, Manuela, Matteo, Roberto and Rosaria VS 2) Andrea, Angela, Francesca, Gilles, Miryea, Ubaldo, Valentina and Vera. Four contestants would be facing nomination: the two most voted contestants by each team and the two contestants named by the leader of each team. Of the four, only one would be saved the public vote, while the other 3 would have their fate in the hands of the leader of Day 46. The leader would decide which of the 3 would be eliminated.
 Note 8: On Day 46, there was a saving chain to determine one of the nominees. The chain went Fariba → Matteo → Awed → Isolde → Roberto → Emanuela. Rosaria was left out and became the first nominee. Subsequently, both teams had to once again nominate someone from their own team.
 Note 9: On Day 57, the outgoing leader (Isolde) had to choose 3 people from her team to be in danger of nomination. She chose Awed, Roberto and Valentina. In return, each one had to choose one person to face off in a challenge, with the loser becoming automatically nominated. The teams were merged and therefore they could choose anyone. Awed chose Emanuela and won, Valentina chose Rosaria and won, Roberto chose Fariba and, since they both had a record-breaking performance, neither was nominated.
 Note 10: On Day 61, four people were facing public vote (Emanuela, Roberto, Rosaria and Valentina). Out of them, one was saved by the public vote (Valentina) and had to challenge the outgoing leader (Isolde). Isolde won, and she had to choose one of the other three people who had not been saved: this person would face off one of the other two in a new public vote resulting in an elimination. Later, the four remaining men (not including Roberto) competed to become the second leader of the night. Ignazio won and had to choose who to nominate between Roberto and Rosaria. He chose Roberto. Therefore, Emanuela and Roberto were nominated. Additionally, the two leaders had to compete in a challenge which would determine the leader of the weekly nomination. The loser would lose immunity and be nominated.
 Note 11: On Day 64, multiple challenges were done to determine which contestants would win immunity. Four people won: Angela, Awed, Matteo and Valentina. These four had to decide which of them would face off against Isolde, the outgoing leader, to steal her immunity. This final challenge was done after the nominations, and therefore Isolde was not eligible to be nominated by the Tribe. However, since Awed ended up winning - stealing Isolde's immunity - she became eligible to be nominated by the Leader. Furthermore, before the nominations and the challenges, Fariba was nominated by production for revealing the existence of Playa Imboscadissima to some of the other contestants.

Season 16
 Date: 21 March 2022 – 27 June 2022 (99 days)
 Location: Cayo Cochinos, Honduras
 Hosted: Ilary Blasi (in the studio) and Alvin (from the island)

Contestants

Nomination table

Notes
 Day 1: Sixteen contestants entered the game. Eight of them were already paired in four duos with their significant other or family member, while the other eight were singles. Antonio and Ilona were given the chance to pick one contestant each among the other six singles to form a duo with: Antonio chose Floriana while Ilona chose Marco M. Later, through a lottery mechanism, Jovana also had the chance to pick her duo partner among the three remaining singles, choosing Roger. The final two duos that were formed had to face off in a nomination, where only the most saved duo by the public would join the game, while the other duo would seemingly be eliminated. Estefanía and Nicolas won, so they joined the other six duos and were immune from the following nominations. Jovana and Roger then found out they were not actually eliminated, but that they would go to Playa Sgamada, a second beach where the duos were disbanded and all the contestants would play by themselves to try to get back in the main game.
 Day 4: Three new single contestants joined the game: Blind, Patrizia and Roberta. Two of them had to form a duo which would join the main game, while the other would go directly to Playa Sgamada. The first member of the duo would be picked by the public through a nomination, while the second member would be decided through the Fire Challenge. Blind won the public vote, while Roberta won the Fire Challenge, therefore Patrizia had to go to Playa Sgamada. Ilona was voted as the Boss of Playa Sgamada, therefore she was able to pick another contestant to go form a new duo and rejoin the main game with, she chose Roger.
 Day 8: Patrizia was revealed to have suffered burns from the Fire Challenge held on Day 4. After receiving medical care, Patrizia decided to walk out of the game for additional treatments, officially leaving the competition. Marco Me. was voted as the Boss of Playa Sgamada, therefore he was exempt from the first elimination which would happen on Day 11.
 Day 11: On Playa Sgamada, Antonio, Floriana and Jovana competed in a challenge: Jovana won, therefore Antonio and Floriana were nominated to become the first contestant officially eliminated. Later, Clemente was voted as the Boss of Playa Sgamada, therefore he could choose whether he, his wife or neither would go back into the main game, with the other (or both) having to face the public vote: he chose himself. Floriana, Jovana and Marco M. then competed in a challenge in order to determine who would become Clemente's new partner: Floriana won. 
 Day 15: Upon stepping foot on the beach, Silvano used swear words and was accused of blasphemy on social media. After reviewing the footage and discussing the incident, production decided to remove him from the competition, as he had broken the rules of the game regarding the use of certain words. After Silvano's ejection, Nick had to form a new duo with a contestant from Playa Sgamada. Blind was voted as the Boss of Playa Sgamada, therefore he could choose whether he would become Nick's partner and go back into the main game or if someone else would get that chance. He chose the first, forming a new duo with Nick.
 Day 18: There was a duo switch: due to Estefanía and Roger's romantic connection, they were given the chance compete in a challenge and form a new duo. They succeeded, therefore their duo partners Ilona and Nicolas were paired up as well. Additionally, since Lory & Marco C.'s had voted for Ilona & Roger through the Judas' Kiss mechanism, their vote became null as the duo no longer existed. Laura was voted as the Boss of Playa Sgamada, therefore she was able to rejoin the main game, together with Jovana, who won a re-entry public vote.
 Day 22: The game entered a new phase where duos were disbanded and all the contestants would be divided in two teams. However, it was announced that one duo would remain joint: the duo members were given the choice to either try to stay together by winning a challenge, risking a self-vote in case of loss, or not compete in a challenge and be immediately separated. The duos of Alessandro & Carmen, Edoardo & Guendalina, Estefanía & Roger and Gustavo & Jeremias competed, with Estefanía & Roger winning and continuing their journeys as a 2-in-1 contestant. Later, one member of each duo would join one of two teams: the teams competed in an immunity challenge, and the members of the losing duos from the previous challenge were given a self-vote in case they were on the losing team. Two new contestants joined the game, Licia and Marco S., and they each joined one of two teams after nominations had been made.
 Day 64: The contestants that had joined the game before the season was extended were given the choice to either continue their journeys on the Island or walk out of the game. Four contestants decided to walk out of the game: Alessandro due to having to study for exams, Guendalina due to family reasons, Licia and Blind due to work commitments.

Season 17
 Date: 17 April 2023 – 26 June 2023 (71 days)
 Location: Cayo Cochinos, Honduras
 Hosted: Ilary Blasi (in the studio) and Alvin (from the island)

Contestants

Nomination table

Notes
 Day 1:

TV Ratings

TV Ratings for the Final Live Show
Season 01: Final Show – Audience: 10,451,000 | Share: 42.75%
Season 02: Final Show – Audience: 10,977,000 | Share: 46.02%
Season 03: Final Show – Audience: 9,513,000 | Share: 42.53%
Season 04: Final Show – Audience: 6,148,000 | Share: 34.40%
Season 05: Final Show – Audience: 6,339,000 | Share: 28.93%
Season 06: Final Show – Audience: 7,214,000 | Share: 31.49%
Season 07: Final Show – Audience: 4,367,000 | Share: 21.50%
Season 08: Final Show – Audience: 4,842,000 | Share: 21.90%
Season 09: Final Show – Audience: 4,366,000 | Share: 21.98%
Season 10: Final Show – Audience: 6,545,000 | Share: 31.99%
Season 11: Final Show – Audience: 4,760,000 | Share: 24.71%
Season 12: Final Show – Audience: 4,253,000 | Share: 24.57%
Season 13: Final Show – Audience: 4,545,000 | Share: 26.43%
Season 14: Final Show – Audience: 3,231,000 | Share: 18.06%
Season 15: Final Show – Audience: 3,317,000 | Share: 22.97%
Season 16: Final Show – Audience: 2,575,000 | Share: 23.30%
Season 17: Final Show – Audience: ,, | Share: .%

References

External links
 Official website of L'Isola dei Famosi in RAI
 Official website of L'Isola dei Famosi in Mediaset

Survivor (franchise)
2003 Italian television series debuts
2000s Italian television series
2010s Italian television series
Italian reality television series
Television shows filmed in the Dominican Republic
Television shows filmed in Nicaragua
Television shows filmed in Honduras
RAI original programming